Jemma Churchill (born 13 November 1960) is an English television, theatre, film and radio actress, best known for her roles as Nanny Lyons in Upstairs Downstairs, and Ms Fellows in Waterloo Road.

Early life and education
Churchill is the daughter of London-born actor/writer Donald Churchill and Liverpool actress Pauline Yates, best known for her portrayal of Elizabeth Perrin in The Fall and Rise of Reginald Perrin.

Following training at the Guildhall School of Music and Drama in London, Churchill spent a year singing in pubs and working men's clubs in the East End under the name 'Jemma Churchill – the Cockney Sparrow'.

Career

Television and film
Churchill's first professional job was as a Borstal girl in the film Scrubbers directed by Mai Zetterling and produced by George Harrison. She appeared as herself in the Doctor Who 50th Celebrations in Peter Davisons' The Five(ish) Doctors Reboot for the BBC.

Churchill's first television appearance was in the BBC Sit-Com No Place Like Home with William Gaunt and Martin Clunes. She then went on to play guest parts in John Mortimer's Paradise Postponed as Cissy Bigwell (1986) and Audrey Wystan, Rumpole's niece in Rumpole of the Bailey (1991).

In the 1990s Churchill played Elsie in Poirot in The Adventure of the Cheap Flat; the sister-in-law of Gordon Brittas, Philippa Belmont, in the cult sit-com The Brittas Empire (1994) and Doctor Swain in the comedy series Waiting For God (1994). She has made guest appearances on EastEnders, Footballers Wives, Midsomer murders, Murder in Mind, Jonathan Creek, The Bill, Kiss Me Kate, Waterloo Road, Red Dwarf and Jekyll. She played Nanny Lyons in the BBC period drama series Upstairs Downstairs, starring Keely Hawes and written by Heidi Thomas.

Churchill appeared in the BAFTA award-winning drama documentary The Plot To Bring Down Britain's Planes for Channel 4. In 2015, she appeared as Freda in the new series of Agatha Raisin for Sky TV, and in the new series of the BBC comedy Still Open All Hours with David Jason.

In a return to film, Jemma played Barnaby's Nanny in the 2018 Christmas film, Nativity ROCKS! The fourth film in Debbie Isitt's Nativity! series.

Churchill set up Two Tree Island Films, and produced and starred in the short film Beached which went on to win the Southend-on-Sea Short Film Fiction award 2011. Then in October 2022, she portrayed Aileen McAllister in the BBC soap opera Doctors.

Stage and radio
In September 2015, Churchill appeared at the Finborough Theatre in Horniman's Choice. Churchill plays a lonely wife and mother in one of the plays in Horniman's Choice, The Old Testament and the New. Churchill also appeared with Janie Dee in 84 Charing Cross Road at Salisbury Playhouse. She has also appeared in The Hoard Festival New Vic Theatre's Appetite, a musical starring Miriam Margolyes and Tamsin Greig; as Belinda in Noises Off at Wolsey Theatre; Polina in The Notebook Of Trigorin; Factors Unforeseen at the Orange Tree Theatre, Richmond; Barbara in Ayckbourn's Things We Do For Love; and the surgeon in Having A Ball.

Churchill has recorded many radio plays for BBC Radio including The Good Companions, Potting On, Hercule Poirot Series, Vanity Fair, The Idiot, Brideshead Revisited and Brief Lives. She voiced Lady Forleon in the Big Finish Doctor Who audio story Creatures of Beauty with Peter Davison, Safira Valtris in Breaking Bubbles with Colin Baker, and Praska in Signs and Wonders with Sylvester McCoy. She played all 9 female roles in Blake's 7 The Liberator Chronicles and played Helena Eidelman in The Judgement Of Sherlock Holmes all for Big Finish.

For Brunel's Bicentenary, Churchill toured extensively along the Great Western Railway route with her site-specific one woman show The Engineer's Corset about Isambard Kingdom Brunel, Engineering and Victorian Women. She played Dorothy Wordsworth in her one-woman show Dolly by Donald Churchill at the Theatre by the Lake, Keswick.

Recently she starred in Jemma Kennedy's The Gift and Annie Horniman's well-received The Price of Coal and The Old Testament and the New.

Coming up, Jemma is due to return to Nativity! The Musical at The Birmingham Rep Theatre playing Mrs. Bevan. This is the same role that she originated in the 2017 touring production of the show.

Personal life
Churchill was married to composer Robert Percy. They divorced in 2020 . They have two children both in the music industry. Marlon Percy recording artist . Addi P singer-songwriter-rap artist

Television filmography

 No Place Like Home (1984) as Lesley
 Gems (3 episodes, 1985) as Rebecca Springett
 Paradise Postponed (1986) as Cissy Bigwell
 Agatha Christie's Poirot (1990) as Elsie
 Rumpole of the Bailey (1991) as Audrey Wystan
 Waiting for God (1994) as Dr Swain
 The Brittas Empire (1994) as Philippa Belmot
 McCallum (1997) as Social Worker
 Bugs (1997) as Doctor
 Strange But True?  (1997) as Reconstruction Cast: Twins
 EastEnders (1997) as Dr. Ericson
 The Bill (1990–1998) (1990) as Babs, (1998) as Janice Fields
 Jonathan Creek (1998) as Second Therapist
 Dangerfield (1998) as 1st Academic
 Kiss Me Kate (1999) as Emma
 Red Dwarf (TV series) (1999) as First Woman Officer
 Where There's Smoke (2000) as Reverend Wilmore
 Murder in Mind (2002) as DS Jane Shepherd
 Midsomer murders (2003) as Maisie Cullen
 Footballers' Wives (2004) as Doctor
 Murder in Suburbia (2004) as Anne James
 Holby City (2005) as Karen Hames
 Heartbeat (2006) as Stella Hill
 Jekyll (2007) as Obstetrician
 Waterloo Road (2009) as Ms Fellows
 Beached (2011) as Mum
 Upstairs Downstairs (3 episodes, 2010–2012) as Nanny Lyons
 The Five(ish) Doctors Reboot (2013) as Jemma Churchill
 Burn the Clock (2013) as Woman in crowd
 Doctors (2002, 2010, 2014, 2022) as Eleanor Wainwright, Angela Pike, Sheila White, Aileen McAllister
 Agatha Raisin: The Quiche of Death (2014) as Freda
 Between Places (2014) as Cheryl
 Deny Everything (2015) as the Boss

References

 http://www.newvichoardfestival.org.uk/people/people/
 https://www.bbc.co.uk/news/entertainment-arts-33109263
 https://www.independent.co.uk/news/obituaries/pauline-yates-actress-who-was-rarely-out-of-work-for-40-years-and-was-best-known-for-the-fall-and-9999566.html
 https://www.thestage.co.uk/reviews/2015/84-charing-cross-road/
 https://www.theguardian.com/tv-and-radio/2015/jan/26/pauline-yates
 http://www.maureenobrien.co.uk/plays.php
 http://www.bbc.co.uk/programmes/p00bpm0x
 http://sfcrowsnest.org.uk/the-judgement-of-sherlock-holmes-by-jonathan-barnes-cd-review/
 http://www.midsomermurders.org/birds.htm
 http://shfff.co.uk/

External links

1960 births
Living people
English stage actresses
English television actresses